High Wood, Dunmow is a  biological Site of Special Scientific Interest in Great Dunmow in Essex. The local planning authority is Uttlesford District Council.

The site on boulder clay and loess has areas of wet ash and maple woodland, and others of pedunculate oak and hornbeam. Some areas are ancient woodland. There is a diverse layer of ground flora, such as dog's mercury and primrose, while damp woodland rides provide additional habitat for birds and invertebrates.

The site is private land with no public access.

References 

Sites of Special Scientific Interest in Essex
Great Dunmow